Susan Travers (born 18 February 1939) is a retired British film and television actress. She is the daughter of the actress Linden Travers, a niece of Bill Travers, and a cousin of actress Penelope Wilton. She played the role of Arlette Van der Valk, the detective's wife, in the series Van der Valk.

Travers was married to photographer Cornel Lucas. Her daughter, Charlotte Lucas, is also an actress.

Partial filmography

Films
 The Duke Wore Jeans (1958) - Stewardess
 The Treasure of San Teresa (1959) - Girl at Billie's
 Peeping Tom (1960) - Lorraine the Model (uncredited)
 Sons and Lovers (1960) - Betty
 The Snake Woman (1961) - Atheris
 Fog for a Killer (1962) - June Lock
 The Statue (1971) - Mrs. Southwick
 The Abominable Dr. Phibes (1971) - Nurse Allen
 Frenzy (1972) - Victim (uncredited)
 The Happiness Cage (1972) - Lady #2

Television
 The Four Just Men (1960) - Receptionist
 The Adventures of Robin Hood (1960) - Serving Girl
 No Hiding Place (1962–63) - Marge Stanley / Frances Lee
 The Avengers (1968) - Nurse Janet Owen  
 The Saint (1968) - Laura
 Van der Valk (1972–73) - Arlette van der Valk
 Dixon of Dock Green (1974) - Sally James

References

Bibliography
 Russell James. Great British Fictional Detectives. Remember When, 2009.

External links

1939 births
Living people
British television actresses
British film actresses
Actresses from London